Trirhenium nonachloride is a compound with the formula ReCl3, sometimes also written Re3Cl9.  It is a dark red hygroscopic solid that is insoluble in ordinary solvents.  The compound is important in the history of inorganic chemistry as an early example of a cluster compound with metal-metal bonds.  It is used as a starting material for synthesis of other rhenium complexes.

Structure and physical properties
As shown by X-ray crystallography trirhenium nonachloride consists of Re3Cl12 subunits that share three chloride bridges with adjacent clusters. The interconnected network of clusters forms sheets.  Around each Re center are seven ligands, four bridging chlorides, one terminal chloride, and two Re-Re bonds.

The heat of oxidation is evaluated according to the equation:
1/3 Re3Cl9  +  4 OH−  +  2 OCl−   →   ReO4−  +  2 H2O + 5Cl−
The enthalpy for this process is 190.7 ± 0.2 kcal/mol.

Preparation and reactions
The compound was discovered in 1932, although these workers did not determine its structure, which is unusual for metal chlorides. Trirhenium nonachloride is efficiently prepared by thermal decomposition of rhenium pentachloride or hexachlororhenic(IV) acid:
3 ReCl5   →   Re3Cl9  +  3 Cl2

If the sample is vacuum sublimed at 500 °C, the resulting material is comparatively unreactive, but the partially hydrated material can be more useful synthetically. Other synthetic methods include treating rhenium with sulfuryl chloride.  This process is sometimes conducted with the addition of aluminium chloride. It is also obtained by heating Re2(O2CCH3)4Cl2 under HCl:
3/2 Re2(O2CCH3)4Cl2  +  6 HCl   →   Re3Cl9  +  6 HO2CCH3

Reaction of the tri- and pentachlorides gives rhenium tetrachloride:
3 ReCl5 + Re3Cl9  →   6 ReCl4

References

Rhenium compounds
Chlorides
Metal halides
Substances discovered in the 1930s